Robin Tolmach Lakoff (born November 27, 1942) is a professor emerita of linguistics at the University of California, Berkeley. Her 1975 book Language and Woman's Place is often credited for making language and gender a major debate in linguistics and other disciplines.<ref name=Cuellar>Sergio Bolaños Cuellar, "Women's Language: A struggle to overcome inequality", Forma Y Función 19, 2006.</ref>

Biography
Lakoff was born in 1942 in Brooklyn, New York. She earned a B.A. at Radcliffe College, a M.A. from Indiana University, and a Ph.D. in linguistics from Harvard University (1967). She was married to linguist George Lakoff.  She taught at University of California, Berkeley from 1972 until her retirement. 

While an undergraduate at Radcliffe College (in Cambridge, MA), Lakoff audited Noam Chomsky's classes at the Massachusetts Institute of Technology (MIT), and became connected to the MIT Linguistics Department. During this time, as Chomsky and students were creating Transformational Generative Grammar, Lakoff and others explored ways in which outside context entered the structure of language.

Lakoff is a regular contributor to the Huffington Post.

Lakoff received national attention for an opinion piece in TIME titled "Hillary Clinton's Emailgate Is an Attack on Women".

Language and Woman's Place
Lakoff's influential work Language and Woman's Place introduces to the field of sociolinguistics many ideas about women's language that are now often commonplace. It has inspired many different strategies for studying language and gender, across national borders as well as across class and race lines.

Her work is noted for its attention to class, power, and social justice in addition to gender.

Lakoff proposes that women's speech can be distinguished from that of men in a number of ways (part of gender deficit model), including:
 Hedges: Phrases like "sort of", "kind of", "it seems like"
 Empty adjectives: "divine", "adorable", "gorgeous"
 Super-polite forms: "Would you mind..." "...if it's not too much to ask" "Is it okay if...?"
 Apologize more: "I'm sorry, but I think that..."
 Speak less frequently
 Avoid curse language or expletives
 Tag questions: "You don't mind eating this, do you?".
 Hyper-correct grammar and pronunciation: Use of prestige grammar and clear articulation
 Indirect requests: "Wow, I'm so thirsty." – really asking for a drink
 Speak in italics: Use tone to emphasise certain words, e.g., "so", "very", "quite"

Lakoff developed the "Politeness Principle," in which she devised three maxims that are usually followed in interaction. These are: Don't impose, give the receiver options, and make the receiver feel good. She stated that these are paramount in good interaction. By not adhering to these maxims, a speaker is said to be "flouting the maxims."

The Language War
Lakoff's The Language War (2000) performs a linguistic analysis of discourse on contemporary issues. She covers topics including the Hill–Thomas hearings, the O.J. Simpson trial, the Lewinsky scandal, and the political correctness phenomenon. Lakoff discusses each topic while arguing a general thesis that language itself constitutes a political battleground.Judith Rosenhouse, "Robin Tolmach- Lakoff. 2000. The Language War. Berkeley: University of California Press." California Linguistic Notes XXVI(1), Spring 2001.

In The Language War, Lakoff introduced the idea that frames create meanings. She quotes that language (either verbal or nonverbal) and experiences is a “body of knowledge that is evoked in order to provide an inferential base for the understanding of an utterance.” (Levinson, 1983)Frames are ideas that shape expectations and create focuses that are to be seen as truth and common sense. When someone decides to adopt a frame, that person will believe everything within the frame is genuine, and that what she or he learns within the frame becomes what she or he believes is common sense. For example, in the 19th century, people believed women should wear corsets and bind their waists. No one thought about women wearing clothes without a corset underneath because it was common sense that corsets are a must-have fashion item.

However, if someone decides to look at the same situation outside of the frame— which rarely happens because people are always convinced that common sense does not require justification— that person will have a completely different understanding of what is in the frame, and feel that common sense no longer makes sense. Continuing the corset example, in our present time it is common sense that corsets are unhealthy and will do more harm than good to a female body. This is why the majority of women these days don't wear corsets. And when we look back to the old frame from the 19th century, we think that fashion sense of that time is strange. This is the outcome of shifted frames.

Selected works
1972: "Language in Context." Language 48:4 (December 1972): 907–27.
1973: The logic of politeness; or, minding your P's and Q's. In: Papers from the Ninth Regional Meeting of the Chicago Linguistics Society,  ed. C. Corum, T. Cedric Smith-Stark, A. Weiser, pp 292–305. Chicago: Department of Linguistics, University of Chicago
1975: Language and Woman's Place. 
1977: What you can do with words: Politeness, pragmatics and performatives. In: Proceedings of the Texas Conference on Performatives, Presuppositions and Implicatures, ed. R. Rogers, R. Wall & J. Murphy, pp. 79–106. Arlington, Va.: Center for Applied Linguistics.
1985: When talk is not cheap. With Mandy Aftel. Warner 
1990: Talking Power. Basic Books. 
1993: Father knows best: the use and abuse of therapy in Freud's case of Dora. With J. Coyne. Teachers College Press. 
2000: The Language War. University of California Press. 
2006: "Identity à la carte: you are what you eat." In: Discourse and Identity'', ed. Anna DeFina, Deborah Schiffrin and Michael Bamberg. Cambridge University Press: Cambridge.

References

External links
 Lakoff, "Language and Woman's Place" (1973)
 Lakoff, "Language in Context" (1972)
 Robin Lakoff analyzes Sarah Palin and the 2008 election, interview with Kiera Butler for Mother Jones, 3 October 2008
Faculty home page (UC Berkeley)

Gender and tags

1942 births
Living people
Linguists from the United States
Women linguists
Sociolinguists
University of California, Berkeley College of Letters and Science faculty
Radcliffe College alumni
Indiana University alumni